The Canadian Peace Alliance / L'Alliance canadienne pour la paix (CPA/ACP) was a Canadian umbrella peace organization claiming more than 140 member groups. It was founded in 1985 but became inactive in 2017.

The Canadian Peace Alliance organized cross-Canada campaigns and actions; arranged political lobbying sessions between member groups and key political leaders in Ottawa; facilitated the development of strategies for the Canadian peace movement; and produced and distributed education and action materials.

The Canadian Peace Alliance's policy and campaign direction was determined by a bi-annual convention of member groups and by a geographically representative Steering Committee.

The Canadian Peace Alliance worked closely with the Canadian Labour Congress.

See also
Ceasefire Canada
Canadian Peace Congress
 List of anti-war organizations
 List of peace activists

External links 
The Canadian Peace Alliance / L'Alliance canadienne pour la paix
Ottawa Citizen story on Cairo Anti-war Conference
Canadian Peace Alliance - Canadian Political Parties and Political Interest Groups - Web Archive created by University of Toronto Libraries

Peace organizations based in Canada